The Men's Irish Senior Cup is the senior field hockey cup competition organised by Hockey Ireland, featuring men's teams from the Republic of Ireland and Northern Ireland. The competition was first established in 1893, making it the oldest field hockey cup competition in the world. Lisnagarvey are the competition's most successful team.

2018–19 format
The 2018–19 format saw the Men's Irish Hockey League Division 1 teams receive a bye into Round 3, the last sixteen. Rounds 1 and 2 feature teams from the Munster, Leinster and the Ulster Senior Leagues.

Finals

1890s

Notes

1900s

Notes

1910s

Notes

1920s

Notes

1930s

Notes

1940s

Notes

1950s

Notes

1960s

Notes

1970s

Notes

1980s

1990s

Notes

2000s

Notes

2010s

Notes

2020s

List of winners by club

Notes

References

 
1893 establishments in Ireland